Pingshan County, Hebei is a county of Hebei Province, North China, bordering Shanxi province to the west. It is under the administration of the prefecture-level city of Shijiazhuang, the provincial capital.

The town of Xibaipo, where the Central Committee of the Chinese Communist Party and the headquarters of the People's Liberation Army during the decisive stages of the Chinese Civil War between May 26, 1948 and March 23, 1949 were located, is in this county.

Administrative divisions
Towns:
Pingshan, Donghuishe, Wentang, Nandian, Gangnan, Zhongguyue, Xiahuai, Mengjiazhuang, Xiaojue, Jiaotanzhuang, Xibaipo, Xiakou

Townships:
Xidawu Township, Shangsanji Township, Lianghe Township, Dongwangpo Township, Sujiazhuang Township, Zhaibei Township, Beiye Township, Shangguanyintang Township, Yangjiaqiao Township, Yingli Township, Hehekou Township

Notable people:
 Wang gao ( 王翺）： high ranking official of Ming dynasty
 Lv zhan shu ( 栗戰書）：senior politician of People’s republic of China

Climate

References

 
County-level divisions of Hebei
Shijiazhuang